Bill Gratton (born February 29, 1948) is a Canadian retired professional ice hockey player who played six games in the World Hockey Association with the Calgary Cowboys during the 1975–76 season. He later coached the Paris 29ers, a top tier Canadian Senior ice hockey team in  Major League Hockey.

Gratton was born in Brantford, Ontario.

References

External links
 

1948 births
Living people
Calgary Cowboys players
Ice hockey people from Ontario
Sportspeople from Brantford
Canadian ice hockey left wingers